Raja Gidh by Bano Qudsia is an Urdu novel. Gidh is the Urdu word for a vulture and Raja is a Hindi synonym for king. The name anticipates the kingdom of vultures. In fact, parallel to the main plot of the novel, an allegorical story of such a kingdom is narrated. The metaphor of the vulture as an animal feeding mostly on the carcasses of dead animals is employed to portray the trespassing of ethical limits imposed by the society or by the religion.

See also

Bano Qudsia

References

Books by Bano Qudsia
1981 novels
Urdu-language novels
Sang-e-Meel Publications books